The Albion CX22S was a heavy artillery tractor used by the British Army during World War II.

Overview
The Albion CX22S was designed and built by Albion Motors in late 1943 to supplement the Scammell Pioneer heavy artillery tractor, which was not available in sufficient numbers.  In service the CX22S was used by the British Army to tow the 155mm Long Tom and the BL 7.2-inch howitzer.

The CX22S was based on Albion's CX23N 10-ton truck. The CX22S was a wheeled 6x4 truck, powered by a  six-cylinder inline diesel engine, through a four-speed gearbox and two-speed auxiliary gearbox.  The cab of the CX22S had bench seating for two or three whilst the rear body had bench seating for four and folding seats for two more along with stowage for tools, equipment and ammunition.  The CX22S was fitted with an  Scammell vertical-spindle winch under the rear body to assist with moving a gun.

Albion built 532 CX22S artillery tractors between November 1943 and June 1945.

See also
M4 Tractor
Mack NO

References

External links
 TrucksPlanet.com, "Albion WD.CX22", trucksplanet.com, retrieved 15 April 2020.

CX22S
Artillery tractors
Military trucks of the United Kingdom
Off-road vehicles
World War II vehicles of the United Kingdom
Soft-skinned vehicles
Military vehicles introduced in the 1930s